

Events
 September – The YMCA cedes rule-making authority and control of amateur basketball to the U.S. Amateur Athletic Union (AAU).
 Rule IV(1) of the "Official Basket Ball Rules" for the 1896–1897 season is changed to establish that a team consists of only five players.  Games previously had featured up to nine players per side, depending on the size of the playing area.

References